Zarneh (also known as Zarnā and Zūraznā, in Armenian Boloran) is an Armenian village in Yeylaq Rural District, in the Central District of Buin va Miandasht County, Isfahan Province, Iran. As of the 2006 census, its population was 61, in 23 families.

Zarneh is a part of larger region known as Fereydan (Persian: فریدن, Georgian: ფერეიდანი, Armenian: Փերիա). The village was historically populated by Armenians who were brought to this part of Iran by Shah Abbas of Safavid dynasty in 1603 and 1604, following the Nakhchivan deportations. As of 2010's, many Armenians remain in this village.

References 

Populated places in Buin va Miandasht County
Armenian diaspora communities